Baku Engineering University is a higher education institution which functions as a public legal entity under the Ministry of Education of Azerbaijan Republic. Baku Engineering University aims to prepare engineers on all levels of higher education, execute programs of higher and additional education in this sphere, and conduct fundamental and applied scientific researchers.

History 
Baku Engineering University was established by the order of the President of the Republic of Azerbaijan on November 8, 2016. The establishment of "Baku Engineering University" public legal entity charter has been approved by the decree of the President of the Republic of Azerbaijan on February 21, 2017. Minister of Education Mikayil Jabbarov visited Baku Engineering University on 3 April 2017.

Education 
The establishment of the University aims to improve the teaching of engineering technologies and prepare highly qualified personnel for the industry. According to the current level of development of the Azerbaijani economy, the university aims to prepare experts with the ability to work with innovative technologies and organize production processes. Specialties on Bachelor, Master and Doctorate levels are taught in Azerbaijani, English and Russian languages. Admission to the university is held on four faculties.

1) Faculty of Economic and Administrative Sciences

2) Faculty of Engineering

3) Faculty of Education

4) Faculty of Architecture and Construction

Baku Engineering University prepares professional engineers  to generate value for society through a technical and professional lifetime. A modern material-technical and experienced academic base allows university to prepare skills on students as theoretical and practical skills and knowledge related with profession, problem solving, working in teams, technical engineering practice, leadership skills, innovative thinking and so on.

Baku Engineering University operates in a big Campus located in Absheron. The total area of the Campus is 200000 m2.

References

Universities in Baku
Educational institutions established in 2016
2016 establishments in Azerbaijan